Tricrania is a genus of blister beetles in the family Meloidae. There are at least two described species in Tricrania.

Species
These two species belong to the genus Tricrania:
 Tricrania sanguinipennis (Say, 1823) i c g b
 Tricrania stansburyi (Haldeman, 1852) i c g b
Data sources: i = ITIS, c = Catalogue of Life, g = GBIF, b = Bugguide.net

References

Further reading

External links

 

Meloidae